The Bahia tyrannulet (Phylloscartes beckeri) is a species of bird in the family Tyrannidae. It is endemic to the state of Bahia in eastern Brazil. It is the second most recently described bird in the genus Phylloscartes after the cinnamon-faced tyrannulet which was described two years later. Its natural habitat is subtropical or tropical moist montane forests. It is threatened by habitat loss.

References

External links
BirdLife Species Factsheet.

Phylloscartes
Birds of the Atlantic Forest
Endemic birds of Brazil
Birds described in 1995
Taxonomy articles created by Polbot